Peeters Publishers is an international academic publisher founded in Leuven in 1857, joining a tradition of book printing in Leuven dating back to the 15th century. Peeters publishes 200 new titles and 75 journals a year. Humanities and social sciences are the main fields of the publishing house, with series focusing on Biblical studies, Religious studies, Patristics, Classical and Oriental studies, Egyptology, Philosophy, Ethics, Medieval studies, and the Arts.

History 

Leuven’s association with printing is as old as the art of printing itself. In 1474 Johann Veldener, from Würzburg, Germany, prints the first book in Leuven. In the 15th century, eight printers were active in Leuven. The best known were Johann von Westphalen and Dirk Martens. In the 16th century it was mainly the Antwerp printers who published the important works of the humanists. The best-known Antwerp printer is undoubtedly Christoffel Plantin, who, due to the number of publications and its high quality, outstripped the other printers.

Under the Austrian regime, the printing house of the Academy of Leuven was founded in 1759. It would continue to exist until the French Revolution.

Under Charles de Harlez, Iranologist and Sinologist at the University of Leuven, the Imprimerie Orientaliste was founded in 1882 to publish its journal "Le Muséon".

Upon his death, the publication of the journal was continued by the well-known orientalists Ph. Collinet and Louis de la Vallée Poussin.

In 1857 the Peeters family began its printing house and bookshop in the center of Leuven. The company grew rapidly and had more than 100 employees at the turn of the twentieth century.

The Fire of Leuven in 1914 destroyed the company. After the First World War, the family focused mainly on its bookshop. In 1960, Emmanuel Peeters took over the Imprimerie Orientaliste and brought the book printing business back to the Peeters family in Leuven.

To this day, the Peeters publishing house is still family-owned and has strongly internationalised its activities.

See also
 List of Peeters' academic journals

References

External links

Academic publishing companies
1857 establishments in Belgium
Publishing companies established in 1857